Eccrisis is a genus of beetles in the family Cerambycidae, containing the following species:

 Eccrisis abdominalis Pascoe, 1888
 Eccrisis adlbaueri Vives, 2003
 Eccrisis brachyptera (Fairmaire, 1901)
 Eccrisis calceata (Fairmaire, 1901)
 Eccrisis distincta (Fairmaire, 1901)
 Eccrisis flavicollis (Waterhouse, 1878)
 Eccrisis maculosa (Fairmaire, 1901)
 Eccrisis muscaria (Fairmaire, 1900)
 Eccrisis perrieri (Fairmaire, 1900)
 Eccrisis plagiaticollis (Fairmaire, 1893)
 Eccrisis scalabrii (Fairmaire, 1896)
 Eccrisis spinicrus (Fairmaire, 1896)

References

Dorcasominae